Frederick Howard Hovey (October 7, 1868 – October 18, 1945) was a male tennis player from the United States.

Biography 
Frederick Howard Hovey was born on October 7, 1868 in Newton Centre, Massachusetts. His brother was George Rice Hovey, and his father was Alvah Hovey.

Hovey won the NCAA men's singles championship in 1890 while attending Harvard University.

In 1893 Hovey won the men's doubles title at the U.S. National Championships with his partner Clarence Hobart with a victory over Oliver Campbell and Robert Huntington. In 1895 he won the men's title at the U.S. National Championships after defeating Robert Wrenn in three straight sets in the Challenge Round. That same year Hovey was ranked No. 1 in the United States.

He died on October 18, 1945 in Miami Beach, Florida. In 1974, Hovey was inducted into the International Tennis Hall of Fame posthumously.

Grand Slam finals

Singles (1 title, 2 runners-up)

Doubles (2 titles, 1 runner-up)

References

External links
 

1868 births
1945 deaths
19th-century American people
19th-century male tennis players
Harvard Crimson men's tennis players
Sportspeople from Newton, Massachusetts
International Tennis Hall of Fame inductees
United States National champions (tennis)
Grand Slam (tennis) champions in men's singles
Grand Slam (tennis) champions in men's doubles
American male tennis players
Tennis people from Massachusetts